Ptychadena perreti is a species of frog in the family Ptychadenidae. It is found in Cameroon, Gabon, Republic of the Congo, southwestern Central African Republic and northern Democratic Republic of the Congo. It might occur in the Cabinda enclave of Angola and mainland Equatorial Guinea. Common name Perret's grassland frog has been coined for it.

Etymology
The specific name perreti honours , a Swiss herpetologist who specialized in African amphibians.

Description
Adult males from the Garamba National Park measure  and adult females  in snout–vent length. The body is moderately stocky in females but slender in males. The limbs are long and slender. The snout is long and pointed. The toes are extensively webbed. The dorsum is clay brown with rectangular black spots. The vertebral band is golden brown. The throat, chest, and knees often have dark spots. The legs have complete crossbars, and the backs of the thighs have irregular yellowish green stripes. The venter is whitish with bright lemon-yellow or yellowish green wash.

Habitat and conservation
Ptychadena perreti inhabits secondary and anthropogenic habitats such as agricultural areas, degraded forest, farm bush, and marshy areas. Breeding takes place in puddles, ditches, and ruts. It is a common species that tolerates some habitat disturbance, but it is still likely to suffer from habitat loss from agricultural development, logging, and human settlements. It occurs in many protected areas.

References

perreti
Frogs of Africa
Amphibians of Cameroon
Amphibians of the Central African Republic
Amphibians of the Democratic Republic of the Congo
Amphibians of Gabon
Amphibians of the Republic of the Congo
Taxa named by Jean Marius René Guibé
Amphibians described in 1958
Taxonomy articles created by Polbot